The "Look to Norway" speech by U.S. President Franklin D. Roosevelt was given during the handover ceremony of the Royal Norwegian Navy ship HNoMS King Haakon VII at the Washington Navy Yard on 16 September 1942. The speech served as an important source of inspiration to Norwegians fighting the German occupation of Norway and the rest of Europe as well as for the resistance fighters of other small countries during World War II.

In the speech the President said:    If there is anyone who still wonders why this war is being fought, let him look to Norway. If there is anyone who has any delusions that this war could have been averted, let him look to Norway; and if there is anyone who doubts the democratic will to win, again I say, let him look to Norway.       The speech also made an impact on Norwegian-Americans and the rest of the American public's opinion on the struggle in Europe. The impression of the Norwegian's situation had been severely damaged by an article by the American reporter, Leland Stowe, who happened to be in Oslo on the day the Germans marched into the city. He witnessed shocked Norwegian civilians standing around watching the Germans march down the parade street Karl Johans gate. He misinterpreted the shock as indifference and acceptance on the part of the Norwegian population and wrote a stinging article in Time and several newspapers which severely damaged the American public's opinion of the Norwegian resistance and therefore their motivation to help Norway and Europe. The speech corrected that impression.

In a speech on 13 April 1940, the President had already praised the Norwegian resistance movement. Roosevelt's interest in Norway was in part due to the good relations established by Norwegian Crown Prince  Olav and his wife, Princess Märtha, and the Norwegian ambassador to the U.S., Wilhelm Thorleif von Munthe af Morgenstierne (1887-1963).

In 2005, His Majesty King Harald V of Norway visited the Washington Navy Yard to view events including a reenactment of President Roosevelt's "Look to Norway" speech, honoring the United States and Norway's long-term alliance.

In popular culture
The 1943 Hollywood-film Edge of Darkness starring Errol Flynn told the story of a fictional fishing village in Norway starting an armed uprising against their German occupiers. It ends in a massive battle in the town centre, where even the priest starts machine-gunning enemy soldiers. The "Look to Norway" speech is then read through the end credits by a Roosevelt voice impersonator.

References

External links
An article in the Duluth Superior
Mentioned in a speech by President Clinton
Article on the reenactment

1942 in international relations
1942 in the United States
1942 speeches
Norway in World War II
Norway–United States relations
Speeches by Franklin D. Roosevelt
World War II speeches
September 1942 events